Paracrama dulcissima is a moth of the family Nolidae first described by Francis Walker in 1864. It is found in Indo-Australian tropics of India, Sri Lanka and the Bismarck Islands.

Description

Forewings greenish bordered with red and gray. Hindwings of the male are deeper orange red while the female has much paler orange-red hindwings. Caterpillar claviform (club shaped). Body yellowish white with brown marbles. Only primary setae present. There are two small conical protuberances found on a transverse ridge. Ventrum is leaden white. Pupation occurs in a dark brown shiny cocoon. Pupa ovoid with cremaster hooks. Cocoon truncated and semi-ovoid.

Larval host plant is Grewia species.

References

Moths of Asia
Moths described in 1864
Nolidae